The 2013 ITF Women's Circuit – Wenshan was a professional tennis tournament played on outdoor hard courts. It was the third edition of the tournament which was part of the 2013 ITF Women's Circuit, offering a total of $50,000 in prize money. It took place in Wenshan City, China, on 22–28 April 2013.

WTA entrants

Seeds 

 1 Rankings as of 15 April 2013

Other entrants 
The following players received wildcards into the singles main draw:
  Tian Ran
  Yang Zhaoxuan
  Yi Mengjuan
  Zhang Kailin

The following players received entry from the qualifying draw:
  Jang Su-jeong
  Liu Fangzhou
  Miki Miyamura
  Zhao Di

Champions

Singles 

  Zhang Yuxuan def.  Wang Qiang 1–6, 7–6(7–4), 6–2

Doubles 

  Miki Miyamura /  Varatchaya Wongteanchai def.  Rika Fujiwara /  Junri Namigata 7–5, 6–3

External links 
 2013 ITF Women's Circuit – Wenshan at ITFtennis.com

ITF Women's Circuit - Wenshan
Hard court tennis tournaments
Tennis tournaments in China